Mobor is a town in South Goa in the state of Goa, India.

References 

Cities and towns in South Goa district
Beaches of South Goa district
Beaches of Goa